"Black Pearl" is a song written by Phil Spector, Toni Wine and Irwin Levine, and performed by Sonny Charles and the Checkmates, Ltd. It was inspired by the 1968 Sidney Poitier film For Love of Ivy about Ivy Moore, a maid who after nine years of service leaves to go to secretarial school. The song reached No. 8 on the U.S. R&B chart, No. 13 on the Billboard pop chart, and No. 31 in Australia in 1969.  The song was featured on the group's 1969 album, Love Is All We Have to Give.

The song was produced by Phil Spector and arranged by Perry Botkin, Jr.  AllMusic described it as "one of the great Phil Spector productions, a phenomenal song with his extraordinary sound."

The single ranked #66 on Billboard's Year-End Hot 100 singles of 1969.

Chart history

Weekly charts

Year-end charts

Other versions
Horace Faith released a version of the song as a single in 1970 which reached No. 13 on the UK Singles Chart.
New Zealand group Moana and the Moahunters covered the song for their debut album, Tahi. It peaked at No. 2 on the New Zealand music charts in 1991.

References

1969 songs
1969 singles
1970 singles
Songs written by Phil Spector
Songs written by Toni Wine
Songs written by Irwin Levine
Checkmates, Ltd. songs
Horace Faith songs
Song recordings produced by Phil Spector
Song recordings with Wall of Sound arrangements
A&M Records singles
Bell Records singles